Agios Efstratios or Saint Eustratius, colloquially Ai Stratis, anciently Halonnesus or Halonnesos, is a small Greek island in the northern Aegean Sea about  southwest of Lemnos and  northwest of Lesbos. The municipality has an area of 43.325 km2. Together with Lemnos and nearby islets it forms the regional unit of Lemnos, part of the Greek archipelagic region of the North Aegean.

Name
Anciently the island was known as Halonnesus, and under this name was a bone of contention between ancient Athens and Macedon as was noted in On the Halonnesus, attributed to Demosthenes. The island was named after Saint Eustratius (Όσιος Ευστράτιος ο Θαυματουργός), who lived on the island in the 9th century as an exile, because he was opposed to the iconoclastic policies of the Byzantine Emperor Leo the Armenian. His grave is still being shown by the inhabitants. The island is mentioned in the Isolario by Cristoforo Buondelmonti in 1420 as Sanstrati. It was also known as "Bozbaba" during Ottoman rule. The Ottoman Census of 1831 states that the Island was composed of exclusively Greeks and that there were 310 Greek males of fit to fight. This registrar did not register women, orphans, Christians below the age of puberty, the mentally or physically incapacitated as well as high - ranking officials, so the actual population would be much higher.

Geography

Agios Efstratios is quiet, isolated and dry, with a population of approximately 300 people. The climate is arid, with little rainfall during the winter months and long, hot summers. The landscape is mostly rocky, with scarce and low vegetation. Locust infestation is a recurring problem. Crops are insignificant; the surrounding sea, however, is rich in fish which are fished by local fishermen.  There are numerous beaches on the island such as Agios Antonios, Lemonies, Avlakia and others, most of which are reached by caique. Agios Efstratios Island is linked by boat with Limnos, Agios Konstantinos, Kymi and Kavala.

Recent political history

The island was used to house political prisoners in internal exile since the 1930s. The first communists were exiled to the island with the Idionymon law of Venizelos, later during the Metaxas Regime and again during the Greek civil war. After Makronisos it became the largest prison island in Aegean. During the Greek military junta of 1967–74, the island was again used as a prison for political dissidents. Exiles here included Ilias Iliou, Stefanos Sarafis, Dimitris Glinos, Kostas Varnalis, Tasos Leivaditis, Yiannis Ritsos, Menelaos Lountemis, Manos Katrakis and Mikis Theodorakis.

On 19 February 1968, an earthquake (7.1 on the Richter scale) demolished most of the houses, which were replaced by concrete prefabricated buildings laid out in a military-like camp formation. Nonetheless, the island retains a very attractive capital, also called Agios Efstratios, while preserving a rather unspoiled Mediterranean environment with pristine beaches. It is mostly a place for relaxation and meditation.

Greece's first green island
Athens News Agency reported that, on 4 June 2009, at a two-day international conference in Athens on "Climate change and Challenges for the Future Generations" under the patronage of UNESCO, Greece's Development Minister Kostis Hatzidakis said that Agios Efstratios would soon become the country's first "green" island, entirely powered by renewable energy sources (RES), its residents relying on solar and wind generated energy and moving around the island on bicycles and in electric cars. Hatzidakis said a €10 million project would be implemented by 2010. At the same conference Professor Philippos Tsalidis, Development Ministry General Secretary for Research and Technology, said that although Greece's energy needs currently required strategic reliance on natural gas, Aghios Efstratios, could serve as a global model for 100% reliance on RES. Agios Efstratios is included in the European Union's Natura 2000 network of nature protected areas.

Transportation
Agios Efstratios has one port, which offers year-round ferry connections to the island of Lemnos, as well to mainland Greece, namely Lavrio. The ship operating these routes is owned by Hellenic Seaways.
There is also a small heliport on the main village outskirts, but it is used mostly for emergency airlift, or coast guard and military helicopters' stopover.

Appearance in popular media
Agios Efstratios serves as the basis for the fictional island of Stratis in the 2013 video game Arma 3, along with its northern counterpart of Lemnos, fictionalized as "Altis", the governing body of the two islands. However, "Stratis" in Arma 3 has some critical differences from Agios Efstratios, including numerous additional military bases scattered around the island in-game, and a large airport built off artificial land into the sea south-west of the village of Agios Efstratios.

In the game, it is located south of Altis, based on Lemnos. The Republic of Altis and Stratis is located just south of Malta in the game, as opposed to east of Greece.

Gallery

References

External links

 Documentary about Agios Efstratios
 Ship Routes to Agios Efstratios
 Municipality of Agios Efstratios Official Page -  Δήμος Αγίου Ευστρατίου Επίσημη Ιστοσελίδα
 Agios Efstratios Sea Pilot 

Landforms of Lemnos (regional unit)
Municipalities of the North Aegean
Islands of the North Aegean